Aplysia oculifera is a species of gastropod belonging to the family Aplysiidae.

The species is found in Indian and Pacific Ocean.

References

oculifera
Molluscs of the Pacific Ocean
Molluscs of the Indian Ocean
Gastropods described in 1850